The Jamestown lighthouse is located in the Jamestown neighbourhood of Accra, Ghana. The  structure was originally built in the 1930s, replacing an earlier lighthouse that had been built in 1871.

It consists of a stone tower with lantern and gallery, attached to a keeper's house. Both lighthouse and keeper's house are painted with red and white horizontal bands.

See also

 List of lighthouses in Ghana

References

Lighthouses in Ghana